Chicago Fire is a studio album by the blues musician Son Seals, released by Alligator Records in 1980.

Critical reception
AllMusic wrote that Seals is "in an experimental mood, utilizing chord progressions that occasionally don't quite fit together seamlessly (but give him an A for trying to expand the idiom's boundaries)."

Track listing
"Buzzard Luck" – 5:08
"I'm Not Tired" – 3:39
"Leaving Home" – 6:42
"Landlord At My Door" – 4:25
"Gentleman From The Windy City" – 4:08
"Goodbye Little Girl" – 3:53
"Watching Every Move You Make" – 3:42
"Crying Time Again" – 4:37
"Nobody Wants A Loser" – 4:22

References

External links
Alligator Records

1980 albums
Son Seals albums
Albums produced by Bruce Iglauer
Alligator Records albums